Christos Kollas (born 1 May 1997) is a Greek professional footballer who plays as a forward for Super League 2 club Egaleo.

References

1997 births
Living people
Greek footballers
Super League Greece 2 players
Football League (Greece) players
Gamma Ethniki players
Volos N.F.C. players
Thesprotos F.C. players
Kavala F.C. players
Association football forwards